Borderline leprosy is a cutaneous skin condition with numerous skin lesions that are red irregularly shaped plaques.

See also 
 Leprosy
 Skin lesion

References

External links 

Bacterium-related cutaneous conditions